Shehab Younis (born 30 March 1988 in Alexandria, Egypt) is an Egyptian swimmer specializing in freestyle. He competed in the 50 m event at the 2012 Summer Olympics.

References 

Sportspeople from Alexandria
Egyptian male freestyle swimmers
Olympic swimmers of Egypt
Swimmers at the 2012 Summer Olympics
1988 births
Living people
20th-century Egyptian people
21st-century Egyptian people